P'ari (asomtavruli , nuskhuri , mkhedruli პ) is the 17th letter of the three Georgian scripts.

In the system of Georgian numerals it has a value of 80.

P'ari is a bilabial ejective consonant and is pronounced as hard Pari.

Letter

Stroke order

Computer encodings

Braille

See also 
 Pari (letter)

References

Bibliography 
 Mchedlidze, T. (1) The restored Georgian alphabet, Fulda, Germany, 2013
 Mchedlidze, T. (2) The Georgian script; Dictionary and guide, Fulda, Germany, 2013
 Machavariani, E. Georgian manuscripts, Tbilisi, 2011
 The Unicode Standard, Version 6.3, (1) Georgian, 1991-2013
 The Unicode Standard, Version 6.3, (2) Georgian Supplement, 1991-2013

Georgian letters